The 2007 Women's Pacific Handball Cup was held in Auckland, New Zealand from 25–26 May 2007. It featured participants New Zealand, Tahiti, Vanuatu and New Caledonia.

New Caledonia were the winners and undefeated all tournament. Next was New Zealand claiming second Tahiti third and Vanuatu fourth.

Results

Rankings

References

External links
 Archive on Tudor 66
 Oceania Continent Handball Federation webpage

Pacific Handball Cup
Pacific Women's Handball Cup
Women's handball competitions
International handball competitions hosted by New Zealand
Hand